Pedro Alexis Canelo (born 3 February 1992) is an Argentine professional footballer who plays as a forward for Liga MX club Tijuana.

Career

Chiapas F.C.
On 5 January 2016, Canelo joined Chiapas of Mexico for an undisclosed fee.

Toluca
Canelo joined Deportivo Toluca for the Liga MX Clausura 2017 after former striker Enrique Triverio joined Racing Club de Avellaneda of Argentina.
On September 17, he scored his first two goals for Toluca against Querétaro.

Career statistics

Honours
Individual
Copa MX Top scorer: Clausura 2018
Liga MX Golden Boot: Guardianes 2021
Liga MX All-Star: 2021

References

External links

1992 births
Living people
Argentine footballers
Argentine expatriate footballers
Club Almirante Brown footballers
Quilmes Atlético Club footballers
Chiapas F.C. footballers
Club Puebla players
Argentine Primera División players
Primera Nacional players
Liga MX players
Expatriate footballers in Mexico
Association football forwards
Sportspeople from San Miguel de Tucumán